In Western universities, a Bachelor of Divinity or Baccalaureate in Divinity (BD, DB, or BDiv) is a postgraduate academic degree awarded for a course taken in the study of divinity or related disciplines, such as theology or, rarely, religious studies. 

At the University of Cambridge, the Bachelor of Divinity degree is considered senior to the university's PhD degree. 

In the Catholic universities the Bachelor of Sacred Theology (STB) is often called the Baccalaureate in Divinity (BD) and is treated as a postgraduate qualification.

United Kingdom
Current examples of where the BD degree is taught in the United Kingdom are: the University of St Andrews (where entrants must hold a degree in another discipline); Queen's University Belfast; the University of Aberdeen; the University of Edinburgh; and the University of Glasgow.

At the University of Cambridge and previously at the University of Oxford, the BD is a postgraduate qualification, and applicants must have already completed an undergraduate degree before becoming a candidate for the degree. The same principle applied at Oxford where the degree was closed to new registrations in 2005; BDs continue to be awarded to those registered before 2005. Registration for Cambridge's BD is only open to senior graduates of that university. The BD at Cambridge is the highest ranking bachelor's degree, and it is so senior that it outranks the PhD. It requires a significant contribution to knowledge in the area of Christian theology, and is awarded based on published work, dissertation, or a combination of both.

The University of Durham BD was of a similar nature, and available to graduates of seven years' standing. It was awarded on the basis of published work of a similar extent to a PhD – the usual basis for the award was a book. It is no longer awarded. St Mary's College at the University of St Andrews – where the main undergraduate award is the MTheol (Master of Theology) – offers the BD following a three-year course of study for graduates in other disciplines.

Heythrop College, a constituent college of the University of London, offered a BD course through the University of London International Programmes, which was not restricted to only members of the university. Due to the closure of Heythrop College January 2019 the University of London itself provides academic direction for the Divinity programme as it continues to be offered through the International Programme. The current (since 2021) London BD is a standard undergraduate degree in religious studies, unlike the more theologically Christian-orientated BDs of the others, where there are options for specialising in Christian theology or religious studies in general depending on module selection.

Ireland
In Ireland, St. Patrick's College, Maynooth (Pontifical University) offer the Baccalaureate in Divinity (BD) degree to students who already have completed studies in theology or philosophy. The Milltown Institute of Theology and Philosophy and most other Roman Catholic seminaries (Clonliffe College, Thurles, Carlow, Dominican House of Studies(Studium), etc.), would also have awarded the BD degree. 

Trinity College, Dublin, as it traditionally did for Church of Ireland clergy, offers a Bachelor in Divinity (BD) as a postgraduate degree; it is the highest ranking bachelor's degree and is so senior that it outranks all degrees but doctorates. It requires a significant contribution to knowledge in the area of Christian theology, and is awarded based on the completion of eight examination papers and a 40,000 word thesis within five years.

The Presbyterian Union Theological College previously awarded the Bachelor of Divinity as an undergraduate qualification as part of Queen's University, Belfast.

India
In India, the seminaries affiliated to Senate of Serampore College (University) offer Bachelor of Divinity as a postgraduate degree. In order to be eligible for Bachelor of Divinity program one must already possess an undergraduate degree. Those with Bachelor of Theology (B.Th) degree are allowed to have a lateral entry into Bachelor of Divinity courses. It is mandatory to have a BD degree or its equivalent to enter into Master of Theology (M.Th) program at  SSC Seminaries.

Other countries
The Bachelor of Divinity degree offered in the region of South Asia by the affiliated colleges under the Senate of Serampore College is a graduate degree with post-graduate requirement for admission, in the sense that only graduates can register for BD. The university is going through change to adopt a three-year BD course with field-work and expand its accessibility through distance education, this will be considered as the essential degree for ordination in the diasporic Christian churches. Meanwhile, the university have implemented a five-year integrated and research oriented MDiv program with specializations.

The same used to apply in New Zealand, where the undergraduate degree is Bachelor of Theology (BTheol). Until recently both were offered at the University of Otago.  The BD was the older, postgraduate degree and was usually attained by people training for ministry in the Presbyterian Church. BD is no longer offered by the University of Otago.

At Moore Theological College in Sydney, Australia, the BD is classified as a post-graduate bachelor's degree in the sense that the normal entry requirement is completion of another bachelor's degree. The BD consists of four years of coursework in theology with an emphasis on biblical studies including original languages. The degree may be awarded with honours depending on grades and successful completion of a research component. The BD is the basic qualification for ordination in the Anglican Diocese of Sydney. Similar courses of study (often only three years in duration) at comparable institutions in Australia have been reclassified as a Master's in Divinity.

The Master of Divinity has replaced the Bachelor of Divinity in most American seminaries as the first professional degree, since the latter title implies in the American academic system that it is on a par with a Bachelor of Arts or other basic undergraduate education.

See also
 Doctor of Divinity

References 

Divinity, Bachelor
Divinity, Bachelor
Religious degrees